Hendren may refer to:

 Hendren (surname)
 Hendren, Wisconsin, a town
 Hendren v. Campbell, a court case